An incomplete series of events which occurred in Italy in 1626:

Births
 Andrea Guarneri, luthier and founder of the house of Guarneri violin makers (died 1698)
 Alessandro Badiale, painter (died 1671)
Giordino, Luc. painter (died 1705)
Giovanni Legrenzi , composer

Deaths 

Baldassare Capra (1626)

References